G. Stanley Hall was a psychologist and educator.

Stanley Hall may also refer to:

Stanley Hall (dancer) (1917–1994), British-born ballet dancer
Stanley Hall (politician) (1888–1962), Canadian politician
Stanley Hall (coach) (1914–1990), American football and basketball coach
Stanley Hall, Shropshire, seat of the Tyrwhitt baronets
Stanley Hall, Clayfield, a house in Brisbane, Queensland, Australia
Stan Hall (1917–1999), English footballer

See also
Stanley Halls, South Norwood

Hall, Stanley